Edward Hibberd Johnson (January 4, 1846 – September 9, 1917) was an inventor and business associate of American inventor Thomas Alva Edison. He was involved in many of Edison's projects, and was a partner in an early organization which evolved into General Electric. When Johnson was Vice President of the Edison Electric Light Company, a predecessor of Con Edison, he created the first known electrically illuminated Christmas tree at his home in New York City in 1882. Edward H. Johnson became the Father of Electric Christmas Tree Lights.

Biographical information

Early life
Edward Hibberd Johnson was born in Chester County, Pennsylvania on January 4, 1846. He was educated in public schools in Philadelphia, and worked as a telegraph operator.

Protégé of William Jackson Palmer
In 1867, William Jackson Palmer and Edward Hibberd Johnson headed west from their hometown of Philadelphia, Pennsylvania. General Palmer was the construction manager for the Kansas Pacific Railroad, mapping routes through New Mexico and Arizona to the Pacific coast.

The Kansas Pacific Railroad was an enterprise of the Philadelphia interests which controlled the Pennsylvania Railroad (whose president John Edgar Thomson had employed Palmer as his personal secretary before the War). Under General Palmer's direction the Kansas Pacific was extended from Kansas City, Missouri, reaching Denver, Colorado in August 1870.

Hiring young Thomas A. Edison
In 1871 Edward H. Johnson, as the assistant to General William J. Palmer, was sent back East to manage the Automatic Telegraph Company. Johnson hired Thomas A. Edison when Edison was 24. Of Edison, Johnson later wrote:

Johnson later was a prominent supporter of Edison, helping him establish his "invention factory" in Menlo Park, New Jersey. Johnson became one of Edison's trusted executives as his inventions and business developed in the 1870s and later.

He married Margaret V. Kenney in Philadelphia in 1873, and they had three children.

Recruiting Frank J. Sprague
In 1883, Johnson is also credited with recruiting into Edison's organization naval officer Frank J. Sprague, whom he met at an international electrical exposition. Sprague became a well known inventor, and was responsible for major developments in electric railways and electric elevators which were instrumental in the growth of US cities in the later 19th and early 20th centuries.

Death
Edward Hibberd Johnson died at his home in New York on September 9, 1917.

First electric Christmas tree lights
The first known electrically illuminated Christmas tree was the creation of Edward H. Johnson. While he was Vice-President of the Edison Electric Light Company, he had Christmas tree bulbs especially made for him. He displayed his Christmas tree—hand-wired with 80 red, white, and blue electric light bulbs the size of walnuts—on December 22, 1882, at his home in New York City, 139 E. 36th Street in Murray Hill, Manhattan.  The story was reported in the Detroit Post and Tribune by a reporter named William Augustus Croffut.  Croffut wrote "Last evening I walked over beyond Fifth Avenue and called at the residence of Edward H. Johnson, vice-president of Edison’s electric company."  He lived in one of the first areas of New York City wired for electric service.  Edward H. Johnson became known as the Father of Electric Christmas Tree Lights.

From that point on, electrically illuminated Christmas trees, indoors and outdoors, grew with mounting enthusiasm in the United States and elsewhere. In 1895, U.S. President Grover Cleveland sponsored the first electrically lit Christmas tree in the White House. It had more than a hundred multicolored lights. The first commercially produced Christmas tree lamps were manufactured in strings of nine sockets by the Edison General Electric Company of Harrison, New Jersey and advertised in the December 1901 issue of the Ladies' Home Journal. Each socket took a miniature two-candela carbon-filament lamp.

References

External links
A Brief History of Electric Christmas Lighting in America
The story of Christmas Tree Lights

Christmas Lights and Lighting History

1846 births
1917 deaths
Edison Pioneers
19th-century American inventors